Amyipunga armaticollis is a species of beetle in the family Cerambycidae. It was described by Zajciw in 1964.

References

Clytini
Beetles described in 1964
Taxa named by Dmytro Zajciw